Felipe Contepomi (born 20 August 1977) is an Argentine rugby coach who is currently the backs coach at Leinster Rugby. He was a rugby union footballer who played fly-half or centre; his last club was Club Newman, in the first division of the URBA championship. He was also a key player for Argentina, having played 15 years for the national team. His twin brother Manuel was also a Puma. In June 2015 he was appointed coach of Argentina XV. Contepomi was inducted into the World Rugby Hall of Fame in November 2017.

Club career
Born 20 August 1977 in Buenos Aires, Contepomi started playing rugby for his secondary school Colegio Cardenal Newman, and then for Club Newman in Buenos Aires. In 2003 he joined Leinster from Bristol on a four-year contract following Bristol's relegation in the 2002–03 Zurich Premiership.

He played a major role in Leinster's run in the 2005–06 Heineken Cup, helping Leinster to a 41–35 win over Cup holders Toulouse, scoring 21 points in the process and winning the man of the match award. That year he was top scorer in both the 2005–06 Celtic League and the Heineken Cup.

In late January 2006, Contepomi's former girlfriend, Paula, gave birth to their daughter, Catalina. Only hours later, Contepomi played for Leinster the Celtic League match against the Border Reivers, a game in which he went on to score 22 points.

In November of that year, Agustín Pichot said that Contepomi was a better player than All Black fly-half, Dan Carter, the winner of the 2005 IRB International Player of the Year award.

On 31 May 2007, the Royal College of Surgeons in Ireland in Dublin conferred him with the medical degrees of MB BCh BAO (NUI) LRCP&SI. He subsequently worked in Beaumont Hospital, Dublin.

Contepomi won the 2007 Rugby Writers of Ireland Player of the Year award. While playing at Leinster, his nominal 'local club' of origin was County Carlow Co Carlow Football Club, a provincial side which later got into financial difficulties and is now a minor Junior concern.

On 12 March 2009, it was announced that Contepomi would be leaving Leinster at the end of the season, and that he had signed a 4-year deal to join French side RC Toulon from the 2009–10 Top 14 season.

Contepomi played a role in the Leinster win over Munster in the Heineken Cup semi-final on 2 May 2009. After scoring a drop goal after 15 minutes in, he was helped off the pitch after suffering a knee injury half an hour in. An MRI scan confirmed he tore his anterior cruciate ligament and was expected to be out of action for 6 months post-op. Almost exactly on schedule, he made his Toulon debut on 21 November against Brive, coming off the bench and scoring a penalty in Toulon's 19–10 win.

Contepomi left RC Toulon to take the fly-half position at Stade Français in time for the 2011–12 season.

International career
Contepomi was one of the stars of world rugby and was also set to lead the Argentina national team into a new era after being named captain in 2008. The former U19, U21 and Sevens international made his Pumas debut against Chile in 1998 and has been an integral part of Argentinean rugby ever since.

The multi-talented Contepomi made his international break-through at fly-half and while he has played much of his rugby in that position he recently has found his place at inside centre with Juan Martin Hernandez preferred at No.10.

He was named in José Luis Imhoff and Alex Wyllie's squad for the 1999 Rugby World Cup squad, where the Pumas made the quarter-finals for the first time. Marcelo Loffreda took charge of the national side in 2000 and Contepomi retained his place, eventually nailing down a starting berth 2001.

He notably notched a full house on his way to 25 points in the 30–16 victory over Wales in Cardiff on 10 November 2001. He was also part of the 2003 Rugby World Cup squad, featuring in three of the Pumas' pool games as they were forced to play four games in a fortnight.

In 2004, Contepomi weighed in with 14 points as Argentina condemned France to their first defeat at the Stade Vélodrome in Marseille. He also faced the British & Irish Lions in 2005 and at the end of 2006 he was part of the Pumas side that scored their first ever victory over England at Twickenham.

The Pumas stunned the rugby world with an inspired performance at the 2007 Rugby World Cup in France. Contepomi was a key player throughout the campaign – featuring in all seven matches as the Pumas claimed third place in the sport's global showpiece.

He was the second highest points scorer in the tournament – notably kicking four penalties in the shock opening victory over hosts France and 11 points in both the pool victory over Ireland and the quarter-final against Scotland. Contepomi was nominated by the IRB as one of five candidates for the 2007 International Player of the Year award, which was won by Bryan Habana.

Following the retirement of veteran scrum-half Agustín Pichot, Contepomi was handed the captaincy of the Pumas in 2008 by new coach Santiago Phelan ahead of the opening clash of the year against Scotland.

A knee injury suffered in Leinster's Heineken Cup semi-final victory over Munster in 2009 ruled him out of action for over a year but he returned to Pumas colours in 2010 and won a 31-point haul in their 41–13 victory over Six Nations champions France.

He was part of the Argentine squad for the 2011 Rugby World Cup in New Zealand playing as captain.

Contepomi played his last international game with Argentina on Saturday 5 October 2013 in Rosario, Santa Fe, against Australia during The Rugby Championship. At the time of his retirement, Contepomi achieved the most test matches played for Argentina (87) and the most points scored in international games (651). He worked with his father in their medical practice in Buenos Aires and as assistant coach in the Super XV for new Argentine franchise Jaguares (Super Rugby).

Coaching career
Contepomi joined Argentina XV in 2015 as a head coach alongside Ricardo Le Fort. In 2018, he was appointed as new Backs Coach to Leinster, succeeding Girvan Dempsey, who moved to Bath.The Irish province of Leinster announced in May 2022 the departure of their full-backs coach, Felipe Contepomi, at the end of the season. The former Argentinian opener joins the Pumas where he is an assistant role to Michael Cheika.

Honours

Leinster
 Heineken Cup 2008–09
 Celtic League 2007–08

Individual
 IRB Player of the Year 2007 – Finalist
 Argentina national team all-time top scorer (651 points)

References

External links

 
 Bristol Rugby profile
 Leinster Rugby profile
 Argentine Rugby Union profile 
 Toulonnaise RC profile
 ESPN Profile
 

1977 births
Living people
Rugby union players from Buenos Aires
Argentine people of Italian descent
Argentine rugby union coaches
Argentine rugby union players
Argentine physicians
Club Newman rugby union players
Bristol Bears players
Lansdowne Football Club players
Leinster Rugby non-playing staff
Leinster Rugby players
Rugby union centres
Rugby union fly-halves
Argentine twins
Alumni of the Royal College of Surgeons in Ireland
RC Toulonnais players
Stade Français players
Expatriate rugby union players in France
Argentine expatriate sportspeople in France
Argentine expatriate sportspeople in Ireland
Argentina international rugby union players
Twin sportspeople
Argentine expatriate rugby union players
Expatriate rugby union players in Ireland
Expatriate rugby union players in England
Argentine expatriate sportspeople in England
Argentina international rugby sevens players
Male rugby sevens players
People educated at Colegio Cardenal Newman
World Rugby Hall of Fame inductees